Mahinder may refer to:

 Mahinder Garh, usually written Mahendragarh, a town in Haryana, India
 Mahinder Tak (or Mahinder Kaur Tak) (1946-), a co-chair of the Democratic National Committee 's Indo-American Council
 Mahinder Kapoor, or Mahendra Kapoor (1934-2008), an Indian playback singer
 Mahinder Dehlvi, a composer for the 1981 film Zakhmi Dil
 Mahinder Pal Gupta, the son of the Punjab freedom fighter Lala Ram Prakash Gupta
 Mahinder Singh, an Indian-Kenyan wrestler
 Mahinder and Maya are the characters in the popular song Mera Kuchh Saamaan and in the 1987 film Ijaazat from which the song comes from
 Mahinder is also the character of actor Kamal Kapoor in the 1977 film Tyaag